Zahra Burton is a Jamaican journalist and former Miss Jamaica Universe 2001 winner.

She is a former Bloomberg News reporter and is currently the host of the television news magazine 18 Degrees North that covers the Caribbean region.

References 

Jamaican women journalists
Jamaican journalists
Living people
Year of birth missing (living people)
Place of birth missing (living people)
Miss Universe 2001 contestants